The following is a list of symbols of the U.S. state of West Virginia.

Insignia

Flora and fauna

Inanimate

Cultural

References

State symbols
West Virginia